Xavier Dunn is an Australian singer-songwriter, musician, and producer based in Sydney. 

He is known for collaborating and producing with Jack River, including her 2018 debut album Sugar Mountain.

Dunn has co-written and produced for many Australian artists, including Cxloe, Carmada, Nina Las Vegas, Super Cruel and Graace.

Early life and career
Dunn grew up in New South Wales. He began playing the piano in primary school, performing in school bands. In February 2016, he released an EP of pop and hip hop songs, titled Bimyou. The album featured acoustic covers of Iggy Azalea's "Fancy", Kanye West's "Gold Digger", among others.

In May 2018, Dunn released his first EP of original songs, proceeded by the singles "Isic Tutor" and "Warming". Dunn performed all instruments on the album. 

In May 2021, the artist launched his own record label and released his third EP, featuring covers of Drake's "Hold On, We're Going Home", Calvin Harris' "Summer", and others.

Discography

EPs

Singles
As lead artist

As featured artist

Other appearances

References

External links
 Xavier Dunn at Atlantic Records

Living people
Australian musicians
Year of birth missing (living people)